Tigre was a 74-gun ship of the line of the French Navy. Later it was captured by the British and, as HMS Tigre, operated as part of the Royal Navy throughout the Napoleonic Wars.

French service

Her first captain was Pierre Jean Van Stabel. When Van Stabel was promoted, she  became the flagship of his 6-ship squadron. She notably fought in 1793 to rescue the French frigate , along with the ship of the line .

Under Jacques Bedout, she took part in the Battle of Groix where she was captured by the British. She was recommissioned in the Royal Navy as HMS Tigre.

British service

Under the Royal Navy she assisted in the defence of Acre during Bonaparte's siege. Her crew qualified for the clasp "Acre 30 May 1799" to the Naval General Service Medal authorised in 1850 for all surviving claimants (27 awarded).

On 8 January 1801  captured the French bombard St. Roche, which was carrying wine, liqueurs, ironware, Delfth cloth, and various other merchandise, from Marseilles to Alexandria. , Tigre, and the schooner , were in sight and shared in the proceeds of the capture.

Because Tigre served in the Navy's Egyptian campaign between 8 March 1801 and 2 September, her officers and crew qualified for the clasp "Egypt" to the Naval General Service Medal that the Admiralty authorised in 1850 for all surviving claimants (33 awarded).

After the Battle of Trafalgar on 21 October 1805, Tigre continued in the blockade of Cadiz. On 25 November,  detained the Ragusan ship Nemesis, which was sailing from Isle de France to Leghorn, Italy, with a cargo of spice, indigo dye, and other goods. Tigre shared the prize money with ten other British warships.

Between 30 October and 1 November 1809 Admiral Benjamin Hallowell's squadron was at the Bay of Rosas. Some of the British boats took heavy casualties in the clash, but Tuscan had only one officer slightly wounded, and one seaman dangerously wounded. By the following morning the British had accounted for all eleven vessels in the bay, burning those they did not bring out. In January 1813 prize money was awarded to the British vessels that took part in the action for the capture of the ships of war Gromlire and Normande, and of the transports Dragon and Indien. A court declared  a joint captor. Head money was also paid for Grondire and Normande and for the destruction of Lemproye and Victoire. In 1847 the Admiralty awarded the Naval General Service Medal with clasp "1 Nov. Boat Service 1809" to all surviving claimants from the action.

Fate
She was eventually broken up in June 1817.

Notes and citations

Notes

Citations

References

External links
 
  Les bâtiments ayant porté le nom de Tigre

Ships of the line of the French Navy
Téméraire-class ships of the line
1793 ships
Captured ships
Ships of the line of the Royal Navy